Copley Academy (formerly Copley High School) is a coeducational secondary school with academy status. It is located in the Copley area of Stalybridge in the English county of Greater Manchester.

Previously a community school administered by Tameside Metropolitan Borough Council, Copley High School converted to academy status on 1 February 2013 and was renamed Copley Academy. The school is now part of the Great Academies Education Trust which also includes Great Academy Ashton in Ashton-under-Lyne and Silver Springs Primary Academy in Stalybridge.

Copley Academy offers GCSEs, BTECs and Cambridge Nationals as programmes of study for pupils. The school also has specialisms in mathematics and ICT.

References

Secondary schools in Tameside
Academies in Tameside
Stalybridge